Phaeosphaerella mangiferae is a plant pathogen affecting mangoes.

See also
 List of mango diseases

References

Fungal plant pathogens and diseases
Mango tree diseases
Pleosporales